Debu Mitra (born 7 August 1948) is a former Indian first-class cricketer who played for Bengal cricket team from 1968/69 to 1973/74. He became a cricket coach in the 1990s and works as the head coach of Saurashtra cricket team.

Career
Mitra played as a right-hand batsman and occasional right-arm off break bowler, representing Bengal cricket team. He appeared in 14 first-class matches between the 1968/69 and 1973/74 seasons.

After having coached Bengal as well as India under-19s, Mitra became the coach of Saurashtra cricket team in the 2004/05 season when the team was in the Plate division of the Ranji Trophy. Being regarded as minnows, Saurashtra became the Plate division champions in 2005/06 and were promoted to the Elite division of the Ranji Trophy. Saurashtra reached the Ranji semifinals for the first time in 2007/08 and also became the champions of the 2007–08 Vijay Hazare Trophy (Ranji One-day Trophy). Saurashtra reached the Ranji semifinals for a second consecutive time in the following season, and became runners-up of 2012–13 Ranji Trophy, under Mitra's mentorship.

Mitra is the childhood coach of Indian cricketers like Sourav Ganguly and Ravindra Jadeja.

References

External links 
 
 

1948 births
Living people
Indian cricketers
Bengal cricketers
Indian cricket coaches
People from Kanpur